Duncan Hamish Kenworthy OBE (born 1949) is a British film and television producer, and co-founder of the production company DNA Films. He is currently a producer at Toledo Productions.

Early life
Kenworthy was educated at Rydal Mount School, Colwyn Bay, North Wales, which is now Rydal Penrhos School, an independent international boarding school. The school renovated the sixth form social space in 2018 and, after a generous donation from Kenworthy during the campaign to all alumni for support, it named the study room in his honour, as The Kenworthy Study Room.

He later attended Christ's College, Cambridge, a constituent college of the University of Cambridge, from 1968, graduating in 1971 with a first class degree in English. He then studied as a postgraduate in the United States at the Annenberg School of Communications at the University of Pennsylvania.

Career
After finishing his education in the US, he remained there, working with Jim Henson. On returning to the UK, he became an independent producer, with credits including Four Weddings and a Funeral (1994), Lawn Dogs (1995), Notting Hill (1999), Love Actually (2003) and The Eagle (2011). His television productions include Jim Henson's The Storyteller and the 1996 version of Gulliver's Travels. He was also co-creator of Fraggle Rock.
Appears in photographs in the credits of Four Weddings and a Funeral (although uncredited) as "Matthew's Gorgeous New Boyfriend".
He is currently the Vice President of BAFTA, having previously held the position of chairman (2004–06).

Selected filmography
 1994: Four Weddings and a Funeral
 1997: Lawn Dogs
 1999: Notting Hill
 2001: The Parole Officer
 2003: Love Actually
 2011: The Eagle
 2016: The Pass
 2018: The Children Act

Awards
In February 2015, the National Film and Television School's Board of Governors bestowed an Honorary Fellowship on Kenworthy.

References

External links

1949 births
Alumni of Christ's College, Cambridge
British film producers
British television producers
Living people
Filmmakers who won the Best Film BAFTA Award
Officers of the Order of the British Empire
People educated at Rydal Penrhos